A gentleman is a man of good quality.

Gentleman or gentlemen may also refer to:

People

Nickname or stagename
 Gentleman Reg, stage name of Reg Vermue, a Canadian indie rock singer 
 Henry Simms (1717–1747), aka "Young Gentleman Harry", an English thief and highwayman
 Chris Adams (wrestler) (1955–2001), nicknamed "Gentleman", English professional wrestler and model
 Gentleman John, a list of people with this nickname
 William 'Gentleman' Smith (1730–1819), actor
 Gentleman Jim (disambiguation), including a list of people with the nickname, the best known being:
 James J. Corbett (1866–1933), boxing champion
 The Gentleman of Heligoland, unidentified body found in 1994 off the shore of Heligoland (Germany)

Surname
 Allan Gentleman, Scottish swimmer
 David Gentleman (born 1930), English artist and stamp designer
 Jane Forer Gentleman, American-Canadian statistician
 Julia Gentleman (born 1931), American politician
 Mick Gentleman (born 1955), Australian politician
 Robert Gentleman (water polo) (1923–2005), British water polo player
 Tobias Gentleman (fl. 1614), English mariner and writer

Fictional characters
 The Gentlemen, a group of demons in the Buffy the Vampire Slayer TV episode "Hush"
 Gentleman (comics), a fictional Marvel Comics villain
 Mr. Gentleman, a character in some novels by Edna O'Brien

Film and TV
 A Gentleman, a 2017 Bollywood film
 Gentleman (1989 film), a Bollywood film
 Gentleman (1993 film), a Tamil film
 The Gentlemen (1965 film), a 1965 West German comedy drama film
 The Gentleman (1994 film), a 1994 Bollywood film
 Gentlemen (2014 film), a Swedish film based on the novel by Östergren
 Gentleman (2016 film), a Telugu film directed by Mohan krishna Indraganti starring Nani and Surabhi
 The Gentlemen (2019 film), an action comedy directed by Guy Ritchie
 Gentleman (2020 film), a Kannada film
 Galantuomini or Gentlemen, a 2008 Italian film
 The Gentlemen (TV series), a Singaporean drama series
 Gentleman (2022 film), a South Korean film

Books
 Gentleman (magazine), an English language literary magazine published in India from 1980 to 2001
 Gentlemen (novel), a 1980 novel by Klas Östergren
 The Gentleman's Magazine, published in England from the 18th century until 1922
 The Gentleman (magazine) (1713–1714) a short-lived sequel to The Guardian

Music
 The Gentlemen (Seattle band), an American rock band from 1998 to 2001
 The Gentlemen (Dallas band), an American garage rock band from 1964 to 1968
 Gentleman (musician) (born 1975), stage name of German reggae musician Tilmann Otto

Albums
 Gentleman (Fela Kuti album), 1973
 Gentlemen (Hair Peace Salon album), 2012
 Gentle Men, a 1997 album by Roy Bailey and Robb Johnson
 Gentlemen (album), a 1993 album by The Afghan Whigs

Songs
 "Gentleman", song from Paradise (Cody Simpson album)
 "Gentleman" (Lou Bega song), 2001
 "Gentleman" (Psy song), 2013
 "Gentleman" (The Saturdays song), 2013
 "Gentleman", song by SL (rapper), 2017

Sports
 Gentlemen (horse), an Argentinian Thoroughbred racehorse
 Gentlemen cricket team (1806–1962), an English cricket team
 the male sports teams of Centenary College of Louisiana

See also

 Southern gentleman
 Gentlelady
 
 
 
 
 
 
 Gentle (disambiguation)
 Man (disambiguation)
 Men (disambiguation)
 Gent (disambiguation)
 Gentlewoman (disambiguation)